Alberto Arvelo Torrealba (September 3, 1905 – March 28, 1971), was a Venezuelan lawyer, educator and folklorical poet. He was author of Florentino y El Diablo, which was set to music as a duet in the style known as contrapunteo.

Legacy 
A municipality in Barinas was named after him, and in the city of Barinas there is the Alberto Arvelo Torrealba Museum opened in 1981.

Bibliography 
Música de cuatro (1928)
Rezagos de un poemario extraviado en la cárcel (1929)
Cantas (1933)
Glosas al cancionero (1940)
Florentino y El Diablo (1940/1950/1957)
Caminos que andan (1962)
Lazo Martí: vigencia en lejanía (1965)
Obra poética (1967)

See also 
Venezuela
Culture of Venezuela
List of Venezuelan writers

References 

1905 births
1971 deaths
People from Barinas (state)
Venezuelan male composers
Venezuelan male poets
Venezuelan schoolteachers
Members of the Venezuelan Academy of Language
20th-century Venezuelan poets
20th-century composers
20th-century Venezuelan lawyers
20th-century male writers
20th-century male musicians
Agriculture ministers of Venezuela